The Central Asia Regional Economic Cooperation (CAREC) Program is a program established in 1997 by the Asian Development Bank (ADB) to encourage economic cooperation among countries in Central Asia and nearby parts of Transcaucasia and South Asia.

CAREC Member countries
The 11 CAREC Member countries are:

Multilateral Institution Partners
CAREC has six multilateral institutions partners:
 Asian Development Bank (ADB). ADB serves as the CAREC Secretariat.
 European Bank for Reconstruction and Development (EBRD)
 International Monetary Fund (IMF)
 Islamic Development Bank (IsDB)
 United Nations Development Programme (UNDP)
 World Bank

Ministerial Conferences
CAREC holds an annual ministerial conference.
 2011 – Baku, Azerbaijan
 2012 – Wuhan, People's Republic of China
  2013 – Astana, Kazakhstan
 2014 – Bishkek, Kyrgyz Republic
 2015 – Ulaanbaatar, Mongolia
 2016 – Islamabad, Pakistan
 2017 – Dushanbe, Tajikistan

See also 
 Quadrilateral Traffic in Transit Agreement
 Khyber Pass Economic Corridor

References

External links
CAREC Program
CAREC Program at the Asian Development Bank
CAREC 2030: Connecting the Region for Shared and Sustainable Development
The Almaty–Bishkek Economic Corridor
From Landlocked to Linked In: The Central Asia Regional Economic Cooperation Program
Unlocking the Potential of Railways: A Railway Strategy for CAREC (2017–2030)
Safely Connected: A Regional Road Safety Strategy for CAREC Countries (2017–2030)

Central Asia
Afghanistan–Tajikistan relations
Kyrgyzstan–Tajikistan relations
Tajikistan–Uzbekistan relations
Kyrgyzstan–Uzbekistan relations
Kazakhstan–Kyrgyzstan relations
Kazakhstan–Uzbekistan relations
Central Asia–Pakistan relations